The structure of a thing is how the parts of it relate to each other. In gardens, the term can be applied to soil structure or planting design structure, but it is most often used for structures made out of hard materials including: timber, brick, concrete, metal, plastic, glass, etc. 

The category of garden structures therefore includes:

garden buildings
garden pond
garden railway
garden trellis
gazebo
greenhouse
green wall
grotto
shell grotto
decking
fencing
folly
moon bridge
moon gate
patio
pergola
picnic table
shade house
shed
stone wall
terrace
water feature
zig-zag bridge

See also
Garden design

Garden features